This article lists all the confirmed national football squads for the 2007 FIFA Women's World Cup held in China between 10 and 30 September 2007. The 16 national teams involved in the tournament were required to register a squad of up to 21 players, including three goalkeepers. Only players in these squads were eligible to take part in the tournament.

Group A

Argentina
Head coach: Carlos Borrello

England
Head coach: Hope Powell

Germany
Head coach: Silvia Neid

Japan
Head coach: Hiroshi Ohashi

Group B

Nigeria
Head coach: Ntiero Effiom

North Korea
Head coach: Kim Kwang-min

North Korea only named a squad of 20 players, leaving the number 13 shirt unassigned.

Sweden
Head coach: Thomas Dennerby

United States
Head coach: Greg Ryan

Group C

Australia
Head coach:  Tom Sermanni

Canada
Head coach:  Even Pellerud

Ghana
Head coach: Isaac Paha

Norway
Head coach: Bjarne Berntsen

Group D

Brazil
Head coach: Jorge Barcellos

China PR
Head coach:  Marika Domanski-Lyfors

Denmark
Head coach: Kenneth Heiner-Møller

New Zealand
Head coach:  John Herdman

References

External links

Squads
FIFA Women's World Cup squads